is the second-largest city in Okinawa Prefecture, Japan, following Naha, the capital city. As of December 2012, the city has an estimated population of 138,431 and a population density of 2,625.12 persons per km². The total area is 49.00 km².

History
Under the Ryukyu Kingdom the present-day area of Okinawa City was occupied by two magiri, a type of administrative district. The Goeku magiri occupied the south of the city, and the north of the city was part of the Misato magiri.

In 1908, Okinawa Prefecture ended the magiri system and established the villages of Goeku and Misato. Both villages were agricultural and lacked urbanized areas prior to World War II.

After the Battle of Okinawa the United States established the first refugee camp in Okinawa in the area south of present-day Kadena Air Base. The population of the former villages swelled rapidly. An area of Goeku, called Goya (ごや), was mispronounced by Americans as Koza (コザ). Koza was the first city to use the katakana syllabary for its name. Misato merged into a neighboring community, and in 1946, again became separate, as did Goeku. Both municipalities, which were formerly largely agricultural, became heavily urbanized as a result of the construction of refugee camps and the establishment of large-scale military bases. The area became a "base city" catering to United States military personnel. On June 13, 1956, Goeku changed its name to the village of Koza; on July 1 of the same year it became a city.

The city of Okinawa was the site of the Koza riot on the night of December 20, 1970. Roughly 5,000 Okinawans came into violent contact with roughly 700 American MPs. Approximately 60 Americans were injured and 75 cars were burned. Additionally, several buildings on Kadena Air Base were destroyed or heavily damaged. The Koza riot was considered a symbol of Okinawan anger after 25 years of US military occupation. The riot was unexpected, and strained the ongoing negotiations on the end of the United States administration of Okinawa.

The city of Okinawa was founded on April 1, 1974 with the merger of Koza and Misato.

Geography

The commercial center of the city lies along Route 330. It extends from Goya Crossing to Koza Crossing. The district extending from Goya to the gate of Kadena Air Base, and Chūō Park Avenue, has many visitors from the U.S. military, and many shops have signs in both Japanese and English. However, the development of large shopping centers in nearby communities has resulted in some decline in these areas.

Neighboring municipalities

Neighboring municipalities consist of:
 Uruma
 Kadena
 Chatan
 Onna
 Kitanakagusuku
 Yomitan.

Environmental problems
In June 2013 more than 20 barrels were found on an Okinawa city civilian soccer field built on former U.S. military land. Barrels revealed traces of herbicides and nearby water had levels of dioxin 840 times above safe limits.

Parks and recreation

A park in the southeastern portion of the city was the site of a National Sports Festival of Japan. Other city facilities include a baseball stadium where the Hiroshima Toyo Carp hold their spring training.

Education
The city operates 15 elementary schools and eight middle schools. There is also a private elementary school. The five high schools are operated by Okinawa Prefecture.

Transportation

Roads
The Okinawa Expressway has two interchanges in the city. They are Okinawa North Number 5 and Okinawa South Number 4. The national highways passing through the city are Routes 329 and 330.

Bus lines
Ryūkyū, Okinawa, and Tōyō buses operate on some 26 routes in Okinawa.

United States military installations
The United States has six installations located at least partially in the city of Okinawa. These are Kadena Air Base, Kadena Ammunition Storage Area, which lie on the boundaries with the town of Kadena and the village of Onna, Camp Shields, Camp Foster, Awase Communication Station, and an Army Petroleum product depot.

The Japan Ground Self-Defense Forces operate an anti-aircraft training facility.

Sports
The city will host some matches for 2023 FIBA Basketball World Cup sharing with Philippines and Indonesia at the new Okinawa Arena.

Notable people

Notable people with links to the city of Okinawa include:
 Gackt, singer-songwriter, actor
 Kenji Haga, singer
 Issa from hip-hop group Da Pump
 SPEED, J-POP band
 Orange Range, band
 Shōkichi Kina, rock musician with Champloose
 Yu Yamada, model-actress
 High and Mighty Color, J-rock band
 Robert Griffin III, NFL Quarterback for the Washington Redskins-born in United States Army Base Okinawa, Okinawa
 Narito Namizato, basketball player
 Tamlyn Tomita, actress and singer

In popular media
 The Yokai King, an American television series was shot in 2013 in various locations of Okinawa City.
 The Karate Kid Part II (1986) was also set in Okinawa, in a fishing village bordering Kadena Air Force Base.  Filming was actually done in Oahu, Hawaii, and Los Angeles, due to the modern build-up on Okinawa.  The Okinawan village portrayed in the film was constructed on a private estate on the windward side of Oahu, where seven authentic replicas of Okinawan houses were constructed, along with more than three acres of planted crops.  Fifty Okinawa-born Hawaii residents were also recruited as film extras.

Points of interest
 Southeast Botanical Gardens

Sister city
Okinawa, Japan has the following sister cities, according to Sister Cities International and the city of Okinawa:
  Dili, Democratic Republic of Timor-Leste
  Lakewood, Washington, United States of America

References

External links

 Okinawa City official website 
 

 
Cities in Okinawa Prefecture